Epacris virgata is a species of flowering plant in the heath family Ericaceae and is endemic to Tasmania. It was first formally described in 1847 by Joseph Dalton Hooker in the London Journal of Botany.

References

virgata
Ericales of Australia
Flora of Tasmania
Plants described in 1847
Taxa named by Joseph Dalton Hooker